Holly leaf miner is a common name for several insects and may refer to:

Phytomyza ilicicola, native to North America
Phytomyza ilicis, native to Europe and introduced to North America

Insect common names
Phytomyza